Natasha Howard may refer to:

 Natasha Howard (rower) (born 1980), British rower
 Natasha Howard (basketball) (born 1991), American basketball player